Skipwith is a village and civil parish about  north-east of Selby and  south-east of York in the Selby District of North Yorkshire, England. Until the 1974 local government reorganisation Skipwith was part of the East Riding of Yorkshire.

Manor
The Domesday Book records that by 1086 Robert de Stutville held a carucate of land at Skipwith. His family held a manor here until 1229, when it passed to Hugh Wake by his marriage to Joan de Stutville. In 1325 it passed to Edmund of Woodstock, 1st Earl of Kent by his marriage to Margaret Wake, 3rd Baroness Wake of Liddell. It remained with his heirs until 1418, a decade after their line became extinct with the death of Edmund Holland, 4th Earl of Kent in 1408.

Churches

Church of England
The oldest parts of the Church of England parish church of Saint Helen are Saxon. The west tower began as a porch, but in the 11th century upper stages were added to turn it into a tower. The tower is linked with the nave by a characteristic Saxon plain Romanesque round arch, so the nave must also have originally been Saxon.

A Norman north aisle of two bays was added to the nave in about 1190, linked with the nave by an arcade of pointed arches. This was followed by the south aisle, whose arcade has octagonal columns. The nave and aisles were then extended eastwards with the addition of a third bay.

The present chancel was built about 1300. It is lofty and has large, square-headed windows with Decorated Gothic tracery. The chancel windows were glazed with medieval stained glass, fragments of which survive.

In the 15th century the tower was raised again with the addition of a new bell-stage above the 11th-century Saxon one. In the 16th century, possibly after the English Reformation, a clerestory was added to the nave and new square-headed windows were inserted in the north aisle.

In 1821–22 the Gothic Revival south porch was added, and in 1877 the church was carefully restored under the direction of John Loughborough Pearson. Notably, the south door was replaced but re-using its original 13th-century ironwork. St Helen's is now a Grade I listed building.

St Helen's parish is now part of a joint benefice with the parish of Bubwith with Ellerton and Aughton.

Methodist
Two families in Skipwith were Methodists by 1764. The village's Methodists worshipped in each other's homes until 1833, when a Wesleyan Methodist chapel was built. In the 1860s the Vicar of St Helen's claimed that 300 or 400 of the villagers were Methodists. In 1876 the first chapel was replaced with a larger brick one next to the parish school.

The chapel is now Skipwith Methodist Church. It is a member of the Goole and Selby Methodist Circuit.

Historic secular buildings

Skipwith Hall is early in the 18th century house of seven bays and two and a half storeys, flanked by a three-bay wing on each side. It is now a Grade II* listed building.

A school and schoolmaster's house built in 1714, founded and endowed by the bequest of a Dorothy Wilson. In the 1851 its pupils included 11 boarders, and in the 1860s a separate classroom for girls was added. In 1871 the school had 54 pupils but in 1872 this fell to only 30. From the 1900s to the 1930s the school averaged 30–40 pupils, but in 1938 this had declined to 26. In 1957 the school was closed and its pupils were transferred to Thorganby. Since 1959 the school has served as the village hall.

 south-west of the village is the site of RAF Riccall, a training airfield that was a heavy bomber conversion unit in the Second World War. The site is now a national nature reserve known as Skipwith Common.

Amenities
Skipwith has a public house, the Drovers Arms, which is now a gastropub.

See also
Skipwith railway station
Skipwith Common

References

Sources and further reading

External links

Skipwith Parish Council
Friends of Skipwith Common

Civil parishes in North Yorkshire
Selby District
Villages in North Yorkshire